Leslie C. Copeland (June 4, 1887 – March 3, 1942) was an American composer and pianist.  As a boy, he played in Lew Dockstader's minstrel troupe, the Lew Dockstader Minstrels. He later sold ragtime compositions to Jerome H. Remick and others.  Some of his performances are preserved on piano rolls.  He died in San Francisco, California.

Compositions
His playing and composing style was very distinctive, harkening back to the earliest days of ragtime.

 Cabbage Leaf Rag
 Invitation Rag
 The Dockstader Rag
 38th Street Rag (Les Copeland's Rag)
 42nd Street Rag (with Jack Smith)
 French Pastry Rag
 Bees and Honey Rag
 Race Track Blues
 Rocky Mountain Fox
 Twist and Twirl
 Ivoryland

See also
 List of ragtime composers

References

1887 births
1942 deaths
American male composers
American composers
Musicians from Wichita, Kansas
Ragtime composers
American pianists
American male pianists
20th-century American male musicians
20th-century American pianists